SS Ardena was a minesweeper and escort vessel built as an  sloop minesweeper for the British Royal Navy with the name HMS Peony in 1915.

Design and construction
The Azalea-class was based on the previous , but with a heavier gun armament. They were designed at the start of the First World War as relatively fast minesweepers that could also carry out various miscellaneous duties in support of the fleet such as acting as dispatch vessels or carrying out towing operations, but as the war continued and the threat from German submarines grew, became increasingly involved in anti-submarine duties.

Displacement was  normal. The Azeleas had a main armament of two 4.7 inch (120 mm) or 4 inch (102 mm) guns, with two 3-pounder (47 mm) anti-aircraft guns also carried. Peony had a crew of 90 officers and other ranks.

Peony was ordered on 4 May 1915 from the Scottish shipbuilder Archibald McMillan & Son, and was built at their Dumbarton shipyard as Yard number 462. She was launched on 25 August 1915, and was completed on 27 October 1915.

Service
Peony joined the Mediterranean Fleet after commissioning. In December 1915, the Royal Navy prepared to evacuate troops from the Dardanelles, with Peony serving as headquarters ship for General Julian Byng during the evacuation from Suvla Bay on the night of 18/19 December that year.  In June 1916, Peony took part in a demonstration in Milo Bay to force the Greek Army to demobilise after Greece had allowed German forces to capture Fort Roupel and occupy much of eastern Macedonia without a fight.

By May 1917, Peony formed part of the Eastern Mediterranean Squadron, which by September, had become the Aegean Squadron. On May 1917, owing to a shortage of seaplane carriers to support anti-submarine operations in the southern Aegean, Peony was fitted to support the operation of three seaplanes. From mid-May to the end of June that year, she was based at Leros, using her seaplanes to search for hidden U-boat bases in the islands of the Aegean.  Peony remained in the Aegean Sea into 1918, operating in the Smyrna area, and was undergoing boiler cleaning on 20 January 1918. In April 1918, she was based at Mudros, together with the seaplane carrier , with their seaplanes being mainly employed on anti-submarine duties. Peony was still based in the Aegean, supporting aircraft operations at the end of the war. In January 1919, she was listed as part of the 12th Sloop Flotilla, based at Malta.

Civil use
Peony was sold to T. R. Sales on 20 August 1919, and was resold to the London and South Western Railway. In 1920, she was reconstructed as a passenger ferry by the Caledon Shipbuilding & Engineering Company at their Dundee yard, and was renamed Ardena, making her maiden civil voyage on 6 December 1920. Ardena was placed on the routes to Cherbourg and Caen which re-opened in July 1921.  She was taken over by the Southern Railway in 1923 and remained until sold in July 1934.

She went to Navigation Constantine Toyias, Piraeus. On 18 April 1941, during a convoy escort, she collided with the  followed by the explosion of two depth charges. As a result, the stern section of Leon was cut off and two officers were killed.

Ardena was sunk by the Luftwaffe in April 1941 and later raised by the Germans.

On 28 September 1943 she was sailing from Cephalonia to Greece with 840 Italian prisoners of war when she hit a mine off Argostoli and sank. 720 Italian prisoners of war were killed.

References

 
 
 

 

1915 ships
Steamships of the United Kingdom
Ships of the London and South Western Railway
Ships of the Southern Railway (UK)
Ships built on the River Clyde
Maritime incidents in September 1943
Ships sunk by mines
World War II shipwrecks in the Mediterranean Sea
Azalea-class sloops